Caloptilia cecidophora is a moth of the family Gracillariidae. It is known from Japan (Honshū, Kyūshū and the Ryukyu Islands) and Taiwan.

The wingspan is about 12 mm.

The larvae feed on Glochidion acuminatum, Glochidion obovatum, Glochidion rubrum. The first and second instar mine the leaves of their host plant along the vein. The third instar induces a gall within the leaf-mine in which the subsequent instar will develop until the sixth and last instar.

References

cecidophora
Moths described in 1966
Moths of Japan